A tosher is a British sewer hunting scavenger.

Tosher may also refer to:

Nickname
 Tosher Underwood (1878–1960), British footballer
 Tom Smith (footballer, born 1900) or Tosher (1900–1934), British footballer
 Tosher Burns (1902–1984), British footballer
 Paul Tosh or Tosher (born 1973),  British footballer
 Tosher Killingback, a competitor at the 1979 Britain's Strongest Man

Other uses
 Tosher, a member of the Tosh Hasidic dynasty
 Tosher, a character from The Day They Robbed the Bank of England
 Tosher Creek, a creek in Kanabec County, Minnesota, US

See also

Tosh (disambiguation)